The 1881 Richmond Colts football team was an American football team that represented Richmond College—now known as the University of Richmond—as an independent during the 1881 college football season. They finished 2–0 with both wins coming against Randolph–Macon of Ashland, Virginia.

Schedule

References

Richmond
Richmond Spiders football seasons
College football undefeated seasons
Richmond Colts football